Southern Asbestos Company Mills, also known as Fiber Mills, is a historic asbestos factory complex located at Charlotte, Mecklenburg County, North Carolina. The complex consists of two red brick buildings joined by a bridge section and constructed in phases primarily between 1904 and 1959. During the 1940s and early 1950s, R. C. Biberstein Company made some improvements and designed additions.

It was added to the National Register of Historic Places in 2008.

References

Asbestos
Industrial buildings and structures on the National Register of Historic Places in North Carolina
Italianate architecture in North Carolina
Industrial buildings completed in 1959
Buildings and structures in Charlotte, North Carolina
National Register of Historic Places in Mecklenburg County, North Carolina